Shutter is a 2008 American supernatural horror film directed by Masayuki Ochiai and distributed by 20th Century Fox. It was written by Luke Dawson and is a remake on the 2004 Thai film of the same name. Its story follows newlywed couple Ben and Jane who have just moved to Japan for a promising job opportunity. After a tragic car accident that leads to the death of a young girl, Ben begins noticing strange blurs in many of his fashion shoot photographs, which Jane suspects is the spirit of the dead girl that they killed. The film stars Joshua Jackson, Rachael Taylor, and Megumi Okina.

It was produced by Regency Enterprises and was released on March 21, 2008. It grossed $10.4 million in its opening weekend and $48.6 million worldwide, against an $8 million budget, making the film a box office success despite having only a 9% approval rating based on 65 reviews on Rotten Tomatoes.

Plot
Ben Shaw and his new wife Jane leave New York for Tokyo, Japan, where Ben has a job as a photographer. While traveling, Jane hits a girl in the middle of the wilderness. Later they start to find mysterious lights in their photos. Ben begins to complain of severe shoulder pain, and his friends begin to comment he's looking bent and hunched over, though the doctor he goes to see can find no cause. Ben's assistant takes them to her ex-boyfriend, who says that the lights are spirits, manifestations of intense emotions. They then go to a psychic, Murasame, who Ben soon claims is a hack and refuses to translate what he says.

Jane decides to visit the office building in the photo. She goes to the floor where the light has gathered in the empty office and takes photos. She encounters the girl's spirit, learns her name is Megumi and that Ben knew her. When Jane confronts Ben, he admits that he and Megumi were once in a relationship but when her father died she became very obsessive and clingy. He eventually dumped her with help from his two friends. Jane is upset with Ben and decides they need to find Megumi.

They go to Megumi's home and find her decayed body; she had committed suicide with potassium cyanide. Elsewhere, Ben's friends Adam and Bruno are killed by Megumi. Adam's eye is torn out while shooting pictures and he dies from shock; Bruno commits suicide by jumping from his apartment. Finally, Ben is attacked by the ghost of Megumi who attempts to choke him. After nearly throwing Jane through a nearby window, Megumi stops, leaving Ben alive.

After Megumi's funeral, Ben and Jane return to New York. Jane finds some recent photos in an envelope which still show Megumi. She finds other photos, taken by Ben, Adam, and Bruno forcing themselves on Megumi. Ben tries to explain he felt it was the only way to drive Megumi away, as nothing else was working. This was the reason Ben didn't want to translate what the psychic said earlier. Disgusted by Ben's past actions and realizing that Megumi was trying to warn her, Jane leaves him saying she will not spend the rest of her life with him.

Angered, Ben begins photographing the apartment looking for Megumi. After throwing the camera across the room, it takes a picture of him, showing Megumi sitting astride on his shoulders. The movie pans back to the hospital where a nurse is weighing Ben, showing 275 pounds, the weight of two people. In an effort to rid himself of her, he electrocutes himself. He is rendered completely catatonic and sent to a mental institution. The last scene is a reflection of the glass from the door, showing Megumi still latched to his back.

Cast

Release

Critical reception
The film received generally negative reviews from critics. The review aggregator Rotten Tomatoes reported that 9% of critics gave the film positive reviews based on 65 reviews. The site's consensus states, "Being a remake of a Thai horror film instead of Japanese doesn't prevent Shutter from being another lame Asian horror remake." Metacritic reported the film had an average score of 37 out of 100, based on 12 reviews.

Commercial response
The film was released March 21, 2008 in the United States and Canada and grossed $10,447,559 in 2,753 theaters in its opening weekend, ranking #3 at the box office behind Horton Hears a Who!s second weekend and Tyler Perry's Meet the Browns. As of June 26, 2008, it has grossed a total of $47,879,410 worldwide – $25,928,550 in the United States and Canada and $21,950,860 in other territories.

The film's $8 million budget and its almost $48 million worldwide grossing has secured the film as an extremely lucrative success.

Home media
Shutter was released on DVD and Blu-ray on July 15, 2008. The Unrated Edition runs 5 minutes longer and includes commentary, featurettes, deleted scenes, and an alternate ending.

See also
 List of ghost films

Soundtrack

Track listing
 "Welcome to Tokyo" – 1:55
 "We Hit a Girl!" – 2:58
 "TGK" – 1:37
 "Making Love" – 2:40
 "Alone in Tokyo" – 0:59
 "The Spirit Room" – 2:27
 "The Argument" – 3:05
 "Fly in the Eye" – 2:31
 "Visiting Murase" – 2:27
 "Jane Visits TGK" – 4:29
 "The Truth" – 1:54
 "I Saw Megumi" – 1:56
 "Driving to Megumi's" – 3:18
 "Rest in Peace" – 2:35
 "Flip Book" – 3:21
 "The Whole Truth" – 2:39
 "Psych Ward" – 1:02
 "Good to Me" (performed by Nathan Barr & Lisbeth Scott) – 3:23

Commercial songs from film, but not on soundtrack
 "Falling" – Performed by Krysten Berg
 "Just the Tip" – Performed by Becca Styles
 "Come on Shake" – Performed by Shake
 "That Kinda Booty" – Performed by Dem Naughty Boyz
 "Sky Business" – Performed by Matt Pelling & Paul Williard
 "Nasty Funky Crazy" – Performed by Becca Styles
 "Fallout" – Performed by Brydon Stace
 "In a War" – Performed by Michael Popieluch
 "Underwater" – Performed by A.M. Pacific
 "Omo Cha No Cha Cha Cha" – Performed by Akiyuki Nosaka, Osamu Yosioka, and Nonuyoshi Koshibe
 "Do Something" – Performed by Shane Tsurugi for Rock Life
 "Seventy-Seven" – Performed by Dino Zisis
 "Oh, Joey" – Performed by Lucky 13

References

External links
 
 
 
 
 

2008 films
2008 horror films
American supernatural horror films
American remakes of Thai films
Horror film remakes
Films about suicide
Films about stalking
Films directed by Masayuki Ochiai
Films set in Brooklyn
American ghost films
American mystery films
Regency Enterprises films
20th Century Fox films
American rape and revenge films
Films set in Tokyo
Films produced by Roy Lee
Films scored by Nathan Barr
Fiction about photography
Films about photographers
Japan in non-Japanese culture
Vertigo Entertainment films
2000s English-language films
2000s American films